Tang-e Chowgan-e Olya (also Romanized as Tang-e Chowgān-e ‘Olyā; also known as Tang-e Chowgān-e Bālā) is a village in Shapur Rural District, in the Central District of Kazerun County, Fars Province, Iran. At the 2006 census, its population was 292, in 62 families.

References 

Populated places in Kazerun County